Foua is an island in Lulunga district, in the Ha'apai islands of Tonga. The island is small and rocky and approximately 30 feet high.

References

Islands of Tonga
Haʻapai